Kim Jae-hwan (Hangul: 김재환; born September 22, 1988) is a South Korean outfielder and designated hitter for the Doosan Bears of the KBO League. He bats left-handed and throws right-handed.

Professional career
After graduation from Incheon High School, he was selected by the Doosan Bears as a catcher in the second round of the  KBO Draft.

In , Kim appeared in just 14 games as a pinch hitter and had 3 hits in 21 at-bats.

After the 2008 season, Kim temporarily left the Bears to serve a two-year military service. During that period, he continued to play baseball in the Korea Armed Forces Athletic Corps Baseball Team.

In , Kim was discharged from the military duty and joined the Doosan Bears again. However, he continued to serve as a backup designated hitter, appearing in only 30 games.

He hit his stride in 2016, hitting .325 with 37 home runs and 124 RBI. He repeated his success in 2017, hitting .340 with 35 homers and 115 RBI. In 2018 he won the KBO League Most Valuable Player Award, hitting .334 with 44 home runs and 133, leading the league in both the latter categories.

International career
In November , Kim was selected for the South Korea national baseball team to compete in the 2010 Intercontinental Cup held in Taichung. In the tourney, Kim won the home run title and was named to the All-Star team, smacking 3 home runs and batting .448.

After the 2011 season, he was selected for the South Korean national team again to compete in the 2011 Baseball World Cup.

In 2018, he represented South Korea at the 2018 Asian Games.

Doping incident
Kim tested positive for testosterone doping after the 2011 Baseball World Cup. He was suspended for 10 games, and apologized to his fans, saying "I will make atonement with my ability."

References

External links 

 Korea Baseball Organization career statistics at Koreabaseball.com

1988 births
Living people
People from Sokcho
Baseball players at the 2018 Asian Games
Asian Games gold medalists for South Korea
Medalists at the 2018 Asian Games
Asian Games medalists in baseball
Doosan Bears players
KBO League catchers
KBO League designated hitters
KBO League infielders
South Korean baseball players
Sportspeople from Gangwon Province, South Korea